Petersburg Independent School District is a public school district based in Petersburg, Texas (USA).

Located in Hale County, small portions of the district extend into Crosby and Floyd counties.

In 2009, the school district was rated "academically acceptable" by the Texas Education Agency.

Schools
Petersburg High School (Grades 7-12)
Petersburg Elementary School (Grades PK-6)

References

External links
Petersburg ISD

School districts in Hale County, Texas
School districts in Crosby County, Texas
School districts in Floyd County, Texas